Brandon Nakashima was the defending champion but chose not to participate.

Vasek Pospisil won the title after defeating Grégoire Barrère 6–4, 3–6, 6–1 in the final.

Seeds

Draw

Finals

Top half

Bottom half

References

External links
Main draw
Qualifying draw

Open Quimper Bretagne - 1
2022 Singles